William Wynyard may refer to:

 Tabby Wynyard or William Thomas Wynyard (1867–1938), New Zealand rugby union player
 William Wynyard (British Army officer) (1759–1819), British Army officer
 William Wynyard (rugby), New Zealand rugby league player who toured with the 1907–08 All Golds